No, Thank You is a South Korean streaming television series starring Park Ha-sun, Kwon Yul and Moon Hee-kyung. Based on the webtoon Myeoneuragi by Soo Shin-ji, it was released through KakaoTV from November 21, 2020 to February 6, 2021.

The second season will premiere on Saturday, January 8, 2022 at 22:00 (KST)

Synopsis
No, Thank You tells the story of Min Sa-rin, a daughter-in-law who tries to live through South Korea's patriarchal society and do what is expected of her from her in-laws.

Cast

Main
 Park Ha-sun as Min Sa-rin
 Kwon Yul as Mu Gu-young
 Moon Hee-kyung as Park Ki-dong

Supporting
 Kim Jong-goo as Mu Nam-chun
 Jo Wan-ki as Moo Gu-il
 Baek Eun-hye as Jung Hye-rin
 Choi Yoon-ra as Mu Mi-young
 Choi Tae-hwan as Kim Chul-soo
 Jin So-yeon as Yeon-soo
 Yoon Seul as Hye-ri
Ha Seong-kwang as Mu Nam-hae

Episodes

Original soundtrack

Part 1

Part 2

Part 3

Reception
No, Thank You is the first KakaoTV series to rank on Wavve's top-10 drama list.

Notes

References

External links
  
 

KakaoTV original programming
South Korean drama web series
2020 web series debuts
2021 web series endings
Television shows based on South Korean webtoons